Dog Days is an EP by American doom metal band Goatsnake, released in 2000 via Southern Lord Records. It consists of material recorded from 1997 to 1999. It was re-pressed by Southern Lord in 2004 on vinyl only and limited to 500 copies. The re-press includes a cover of Black Sabbath's "Who Are You". Also in 2004, Southern Lord repackaged the EP with Goatsnake Vol. 1 on a single CD.

Track listing

References

Goatsnake albums
2000 EPs
Southern Lord Records EPs